The Dixie Flag Manufacturing Company, based in San Antonio, Texas, is a prominent U.S. flag manufacturer. The company was founded in 1858.

In June 2015, following the events of the Charleston church shooting, the company announced that it would no longer sell Confederate flags.

References

External links 
 http://www.dixieflag.com/

Flag manufacturers
Manufacturing companies based in San Antonio
1858 establishments in Texas